is a Japanese politician of the Liberal Democratic Party, a member of the House of Representatives in the Diet (national legislature). He is affiliated to the revisionist lobby Nippon Kaigi.

Career 

A native of Kusu District, Ōita, he attended Waseda University as both undergraduate and graduate. He was elected: in 1971 as the Mayor of the town of Kusu, Ōita, elected in 1977 to the House of Councilors and elected in 1983 to the House of Representatives for his inaugural term; Eto has been returned to office eight times for the 2nd District for Oita Prefecture. In 1995, he was the Director General of the Japan Defense Agency and in 2001, he was Senior Vice Minister for Foreign Affairs. In 2002, he was elected as a head of the LDP's Oita Prefecture chapter and in 2009, he was elected as Vice-Speaker for the House of Representatives.

Etō was a leader in the movement to make Mountain Day a national holiday.

Honours
 : Medal of Honour by the National Assembly of Armenia.
 : Knight Grand Cross of the Order of Orange-Nassau (29 October 2014)
 : Hilal-i-Pakistan (2019).

References

External links 

  

Members of the House of Representatives (Japan)
Living people
1941 births
Liberal Democratic Party (Japan) politicians
Mayors of places in Japan
Japanese defense ministers
Waseda University alumni
21st-century Japanese politicians
People from Gangjin County
Members of Nippon Kaigi
Recipients of Hilal-i-Pakistan
Politicians from Ōita Prefecture